Bakradze is a Georgian surname. Notable people with the surname include:

Akaki Bakradze (1928–1999), Georgian writer, literary critic and art historian 
Constantine Bakradze (1898–1970), Georgian philosopher 
David Bakradze (born 1972), Georgian politician 
Dimitri Bakradze (1826–1890), Georgian historian 
Zakaria Bakradze (1870–1938), Georgian-Polish military officer

Surnames of Georgian origin
Georgian-language surnames